DB Station&Service AG is a subsidiary of Deutsche Bahn, responsible for managing over 5,400 train stations on the German railway network.

References

External links
 

Deutsche Bahn
Companies based in Berlin
1999 establishments in Germany